Empress (Dowager) Liang (Chinese: 梁太后; Tangut: , d. 1085), posthumously titled Empress Gongsu Zhangxian (恭肅章憲皇后), was the empress consort of Emperor Yizong of Western Xia. She was a member of the Liang clan, but her personal name is not known. She was regent of Western Xia during the minority of her son Emperor Huizong of Western Xia in 1061–1067.

References 

11th-century births
1085 deaths
11th-century women rulers
11th-century Tangut women
Western Xia empresses
Year of birth unknown
Regents of China